Kimball Creek is an  stream in northeastern Minnesota, the United States. It is a tributary of Lake Superior.

Kimball Creek was named for Charles G. Kimball, an explorer who drowned in Lake Superior near the creek.

See also
List of rivers of Minnesota

References

Minnesota Watersheds
USGS Hydrologic Unit Map - State of Minnesota (1974)

Rivers of Cook County, Minnesota
Rivers of Minnesota
Tributaries of Lake Superior